Amrit Bhushan Dev Adhikari (1858–1942). Back in 1810 Saka (Shaka era), king of gauripur, Bahadur organised "All Goalpara convention". The hidden agenda behind this was to make Goalpara a Bengali speaking district. But not even the king of Goalpara, Prabhat Chandra Baruah learned of this. Amritbhusan Dev Adhikari was one of the many exponents who threw apart this conspiracy. Amritbhusan Dev Adhikari was a sincere and dedicated person. He wrote regular columns and articles in contemporary magazines of the time like Ba'hi, Abwahan. He was a scholar in Sanskrit literature.

Early years 
ABD Adhikari was born in 1858 AD, at Dolgoma Sat'ra in Goalpara district of Assam. His father, Kathabhusan Dev Adhikari and mother Akashilata belonged to the family of Naraharidev, who had established the Dolgoma Sat'ra. After the demise of his father, ABD Adhikari stayed with his elder brother, Rajendra Bhusan and continued his studies. He went to then Calcutta for higher studies. He took admission in Scottish Church ( then General Assembly Institution), but couldn't complete his graduation due to the sudden death of his brother in his third year.

Later years 
ABD Adhikari came back to Assam and got a job in Bezbaruah High School Jorhat as assistant headmaster. Thereafter, he joined a newly established High school in Gauripur as assistant headmaster.

Contributions 
ABD Adhikari wrote a book namely "Srimon Naam Ghukha"(শ্ৰীমন নামঘোষা)in 1911. The book is a simplification of Sri Madhavdeva's Naam Ghukha. ABD Adhikari presided over the fifth session of Assam Sa(~kha')hitya Sa(~kha')bha {Asam Sahitya Sabha} held in Jorhat district from 31 March 1923 AD.

See also
 Assamese literature
 History of Assamese literature
 List of Asam Sahitya Sabha presidents
 List of Assamese writers with their pen names

References

Writers from Assam
Asom Sahitya Sabha Presidents
1858 births
1942 deaths
People from Goalpara district
20th-century Indian translators